Escarrilla is a locality located in the municipality of Sallent de Gállego, in Huesca province, Aragon, Spain. As of 2020, it has a population of 202.

Geography 
Escarrilla is located 78km north of Huesca.

References

Populated places in the Province of Huesca